Isaac D. Seyburn (March 1824 – March 6, 1895) was a Welsh-American merchant captain who served as an officer in the United States Navy during the Civil War, with the rank of Acting-Master.  He was wounded in action during the 1861 Battle of Port Royal.  During 1863 he commanded the schooner  as part of the West Gulf Blockading Squadron under Rear Admiral David Farragut.  Seyburn resigned his commission in 1864 due to war injuries and initially settled in Maine.  He later moved to Louisiana, where he operated a sugar plantation.

Background and personal life
Isaac D. Seyburn was born in Wales in March 1824. By profession, he was a "Master Mariner."

On March 15, 1848, he was married in Pittston, Maine, to Mary Ann Rogers who was born in New York City on November 20, 1828. She was a daughter of John Rogers (1800–1863) and Elizabeth Carroll Reynolds (1806–1871). Her grandfather, Bernard Reynolds (1763–1833), served in the Continental Army during the American Revolutionary War.

Isaac and Mary Ann Seyburn had five children, Emily Williamson Seyburn (1853–1934), Mary Catharine Seyburn (1854–1893), Stephen Young Seyburn (1856–1923), Edward Isaac Seyburn (1860–1931) and John Rogers Seyburn (1867–1905), who were all born in Maine.

Seafaring career
In 1854, Seyburn acquired a brig, a two-masted, square-rigged merchant ship of about  that he named the Emily W. Seyburn after his first child who had been born the year before.  The brig was registered in Pittston, Maine.  There are records of its periodic arrival in New York between 1854 and 1860 carrying cargo under charter, e.g., coal from Newcastle upon Tyne in England, flour from New Orleans, nickel and hides from Montevideo in  Uruguay.  By 1857, the brig was either sold or another Master was hired to sail her because records indicate that Seyburn thereafter was Master of the ship Stephen J. Young (1856–1857), and Master of the ship Lew Chew (1857–1861).  Stephen J. Young was the son of Stephen Young, the ship's owner; he was also the owner of the Lew Chew; Seyburn's eldest son was named after him.

Civil War naval service
On August 29, 1861, Isaac D. Seyburn volunteered for service in the United States Navy and was awarded a temporary commission as an Acting Master, a volunteer officer whose term of service was until the end of the Civil War.  The naval rank of "Master" was later replaced by that of "Lieutenant (junior grade)."  He reported for service in New York on September 10, 1861.

Seyburn was seriously wounded in action aboard the steam sloop of war  during the Battle of Port Royal on November 7, 1861. The battle was a major Union victory and up until then the largest naval and amphibious force ever assembled by the United States. Seyburn was wounded when a 32-pound solid minie ball from defending shore batteries shattered the bones of his lower left leg just above the ankle.  Seyburn was treated at the Naval Hospital, Brooklyn, New York, between November 14, 1861 and March 1, 1862.   He never regained use of the leg, but was confined to crutches and endured pain for the rest of his life.

Despite his injuries, Seyburn continued with his naval service. During his convalescence, he was assigned to the Monitor Board in New York and was a member of the team supervising the construction of the Passaic-class monitor  in Jersey City, New Jersey. At about the time the Weehawken was launched on November 5, 1862, Seyburn was ordered to the ironclad steamer  where he served until the end of her deployment on May 21, 1863, when the ship arrived in Philadelphia for repairs.

While under his command, the Kittatinny was assigned to the West Gulf Blockading Squadron under the overall command of Rear-Admiral David Farragut. The ship is credited with having chased an unidentified schooner ashore on September 22, 1863, where that vessel was burned by her crew, and with having captured the three-masted schooner, Reserve, on October 25, 1863, off Pass Cavallo, Texas.

On December 23, 1863, while on deployment off the coast of Texas, Seyburn was ordered to proceed with the Kittatinny to New Orleans.  Shortly after his arrival, Seyburn submitted his resignation.  In his letter, dated February 18, 1864, from the station ship , Seyburn indicated that he wanted to resign because he had been crippled by his wound and because "the high handed injustice practiced on me by the Commanding officers of the first division of this Squadron is to me insufferable."  His resignation was accepted and Seyburn was honorably discharged on March 24, 1864, in Gardiner, Maine.

Post-war life
Idlewild was a sugar cane plantation and Isaac D. Seyburn earned his livelihood as a planter. His wife, Mary Ann, died on March 19, 1880, and Isaac D. Seyburn died on March 6, 1895.

Postscript
Isaac D. Seyburn was of the Episcopal faith and attended services at the Holy Trinity Church in Patterson, Louisiana.  When the church was deconsecrated in 1940, the stained glass window over the altar, known as the Seyburn Memorial, was acquired by St. Mary's Episcopal Church in nearby Franklin, Louisiana, where it remains today. 

Idlewild Plantation remained in the family at least until Edward Isaac Seyburn's son, Edward Reynolds Seyburn, sold it in 1977. It was purchased by Dr. Walter H. Daniels. He and his wife Pam still reside in Idlewild. Dr. Daniels efforts got Idlewild Plantation  listed on the National Register of Historic Places (Designation No. 82000459 of November 2, 1982).

One of the eight Flying Junior dinghies in the Vanderbilt Sailing Club fleet was named for Isaac D. Seyburn, who was the great great great grandfather of a former commodore of the club; another was named Lew Chew.

References

Articles
The New York Times, "Marine Intelligence," October 23, 1854, March 25, 1857, March 22, 1858, September 18, 1858, February 8, 1860 (all on page 8)  
The New York Times, "News from Washington, Naval Orders," November 15, 1862, page 1.
The New York Times, "Local Intelligence," May 24, 1863, page 6.
The News, Port Arthur, Texas, February 28, 1975, page 9

Genealogical records
U.S. Federal Census, 1850, 1860, 1870, 1880, 1900, 1910.
The Compendium of American Genealogy, 1600s-1800s, Volume VI, Lineage Records, page 660.
The New England Historic Genealogical Society, The New England Historical and Genealogical Register, 1847–1994, Volume 90, page 358, Boston, 1936
The New England Historic Genealogical Society, Vital Records of Pittston, Maine, to the Year 1892
Office of the Secretary of State, Louisiana, New Orleans, Louisiana Death Records Index, 1804–1949. 
Stephanie J. Richmond, National Archives and Records Administration, Old Military and Civil Records Branch, Textual Archives Services Division, Letter dated March 10, 2005, ref. 2503577/sr.
National Archives and Records Administration, Union Pension Applications, 1861–1938, Invalid Pension Application No. 943, Certificate No. 3369, the "Pension File" of Seyburn, Isaac D., U.S. Navy, Acting Master.

Maritime & Naval Records
Baker, William Avery, A Maritime History of Bath, Maine and the Kennebec River Region, Volume II, Appendix A – Construction Record, pages 916, 954 & 955, The Marine Research Society of Bath, Bath, Maine, 1973.
Official Records of the Union and Confederate Navies in the War of the Rebellion, Series I, Volume 12, South Atlantic Blockading Squadron from October 29, 1861, to May 13, 1862, pages 265- 266, U.S. Government Printing Office (USGPO), Washington, D.C., 1901.
Official Records of the Union and Confederate Navies in the War of the Rebellion, Series I, Volume 20, West Gulf Blockading Squadron from March 15 to December 31, 1863, pages 434, 596, 641, 732, U.S. Government Printing Office (USGPO), Washington, D.C., 1905.
American Lloyds' Registry of American and Foreign Shipping, Ships, Lew Chew, No. 1495, page 62, Ferris & Pratt, New York, 1861.

External links
  The Iron Captains, Union Ironclad Commanders, A Note on Ranks
 Max Shaw, Port Royal Expedition, November 1861, Civil War @ Charleston Website
 Sarah Gates Sully, History of St. Mary's Episcopal Church, Franklin, Louisiana
 National Register of Historic Places, State Listings, Louisiana - St. Mary County
 USS Kittatinny Dictionary of American Naval Fighting Ships, U.S. Department of the Navy, Naval Historical Center, Washington, D.C. 

1824 births
1895 deaths
Union Navy officers
United States Navy officers
Welsh emigrants to the United States
People from Pittston, Maine
People from Patterson, Louisiana
19th-century American Episcopalians
American sailors